Gusinoozersk (Galuuta Nuur; , Galuutnuur) is a town and the administrative center of Selenginsky District of the Republic of Buryatia, Russia. Population:    13,800 (1970). It was previously known as Shakhty (until 1953).

Geography

History
It was founded in 1939 under the name Shakhty, in connection with the commencement of exploitation of brown coal deposits in the area. In 1953, it was granted town status and given its present name, derived from Gusinoye Ozero (lit. "goose lake"), the Russian name for the lake on which the town stands.

Administrative and municipal status
Within the framework of administrative divisions, Gusinoozersk serves as the administrative center of Selenginsky District. As an administrative division, it is, together with two rural localities, incorporated within Selenginsky District as the Town of Gusinoozersk. As a municipal division, the Town of Gusinoozyorsk is incorporated within Selenginsky Municipal District as Gusinoozersk Urban Settlement.

Economy
The main focus of the town's economy remains brown coal production and the associated power station, although mining activities on the nearby deposits slowed during the economic crisis of the 1990s.

Transportation

Military
The 245th Motor Rifle Division of the Russian Ground Forces was located in the town until it was reduced to a Base for Storage of Weapons and Equipment in 2006.

References

Notes

Sources

External links

Official website of Gusinoozyorsk 
Gusinoozyorsk Business Directory 

Cities and towns in Buryatia
Populated places in Selenginsky District
Cities and towns built in the Soviet Union
Populated places established in 1939
1939 establishments in the Soviet Union